JMH Aassan Maulaana (born October 8) is an Indian Politician Member of Legislative Assembly of Tamil Nadu. He was elected to the Tamil Nadu Legislative Assembly from Velachery constituency as an Indian National Congress (INC) candidate during the 2021 Tamil Nadu elections and he is the president of the Tamil Nadu Youth Congress.
He defeated ADMK candidate M.K. Ashok during the 17th Tamil Nadu Assembly. He is the son of J. M. Aaroon Rashid, former Member of Parliament for Theni.

Electoral performance

References 

Living people
Year of birth missing (living people)
Tamil Nadu MLAs 2021–2026
Tamil Nadu politicians
Indian National Congress politicians from Tamil Nadu